Edelithus is a genus of araneomorph spiders in the family Phrurolithidae. It was first described by Liu & Li in 2022.

Species 
 it contains five species:

 Edelithus huyanzhuo Lin & Li, 2023 — Vietnam
 Edelithus linchong Lin & Li, 2023 — Vietnam
 Edelithus puer Liu & Li, 2022 — China
 Edelithus qinming Lin & Li, 2023 — Vietnam
 Edelithus shenmiguo Liu & Li, 2022 (type) — China

References 

Phrurolithidae genera
Spiders of Asia
Phrurolithidae